Embraceable You is an album by jazz trumpeter Chet Baker recorded in 1957 but not released on the Pacific Jazz label until 1995. One song, "Trav'lin' Light" was previously released on the album Pretty/Groovy in 1958 but all other tracks were previously unissued.

Reception

Allmusic rated the album with 1½ stars stating "A ballad collection that emphasizes Chet Baker's troubled-romantic vocal style, it's not too surprising that these 1957 recordings remained in the vaults for almost 40 years... While it isn't the place to start, Embraceable You is a fascinating example of why Chet Baker's tragic spirit remains as attractive today as it was in his lifetime".

Track listing
 "The Night We Called It a Day" (Tom Adair, Matt Dennis) – 2:22
 "Little Girl Blue" [Instrumental Version] (Lorenz Hart, Richard Rodgers) – 4:33
 "Embraceable You" (George Gershwin, Ira Gershwin) – 2:06
 "They All Laughed" (Gershwin, Gershwin) – 2:08
 "There's a Lull in My Life" (Mack Gordon, Harry Revel) – 2:53
 "What Is There to Say?" (Vernon Duke, Yip Harburg) – 3:38
 "While My Lady Sleeps" (Gus Kahn, Bronisław Kaper) – 2:48
 "Forgetful" (George Handy, Jack Segal) – 2:35
 "How Long Has This Been Going On?" (Gershwin, Gershwin) – 2:46
 "Come Rain or Come Shine" (Harold Arlen, Johnny Mercer) – 2:07
 "On Green Dolphin Street" (Kaper, Ned Washington) – 3:07
 "Little Girl Blue" [Vocal Version] (Hart, Rodgers) – 4:30
 "Trav'lin' Light" (Mercer, Jimmy Mundy, Trummy Young) – 3:09

Personnel
Chet Baker – trumpet, vocals
Dave Wheat – guitar 
Russ Savakus (listed as "Ross Savakus") – bass

References 

1995 albums
Chet Baker albums
Pacific Jazz Records albums